Ahmed Alami Elouali (born 10 October 1982) is a Moroccan footballer, he is currently attached to Wydad Casablanca.

Career 
Hamada moved in July 2008 from KAC Kenitra to Wydad Casablanca.

References 

Living people
1982 births
Moroccan footballers
Wydad AC players
Association football defenders
People from Kenitra